The 1958–59 Scottish Division One was won by Rangers by two points over nearest rival Hearts. Falkirk and Queen of the South finished 17th and 18th respectively and were relegated to the 1959–60 Scottish Division Two.

The last day of the season saw Rangers holding a 2-point lead over Hearts, with the clubs having an identical goal average. Rangers lost 1–2 at home to Aberdeen. Hearts could have won the league on goal average with a win away to Celtic, but instead lost 2–1.

League table

Results

References

Scottish Football Archive

1958–59 Scottish Football League
Scottish Division One seasons
Scot